12 éxitos para 2 guitarras flamencas (12 Hits for 2 Flamenco Guitars) is the third of three collaboration albums between Paco de Lucía & Ricardo Modrego.

Track listing

Personnel 
Paco de Lucía – Flamenco guitar
Ricardo Modrego – Flamenco guitar

References
 Gamboa, Manuel José and Nuñez, Faustino. (2003). Paco de Lucía. Madrid:Universal Music Spain.

1965 albums
Paco de Lucía albums
Collaborative albums
Instrumental albums
Universal Music Spain albums